Vellalloor  is a village in Nagaroor grama panchayat Thiruvananthapuram district in the state of Kerala, India.It is one of the beautiful villages around the area.The village is full of lush green paddy fields. It's around 5 km from Kilimanoor, where the mc road is passing through and 5 km from Kallambalam ,where th NH 66 is passing through. Bus service is frequently available from both places. 

Main places

The main locations in vellalloor are Keshavapuram, Oonnankallu junction,  Palayam junction,  Althara junction,  cheepilkada junction,  jawahar junction,  Mavelil junction,  mottalil junction,  sivanmuku etc. 

Educational institutions

Govt.LP School Vellalloor and Vivekodayam UP School are the main schools. Also there are anganavadis in Palayam and Jawahar junction.

Demographics
 India census, Vellalloor had a population of 11842 with 5588 males and 6254 females.

References

Villages in Thiruvananthapuram district